Ablaye Cissoko is a Senegalese musician, singer and composer, who plays the kora.

Career
As a solo musician, he has played live shows in several countries, including Portugal, France, Belgium, Senegal, Mali, Canada, Germany, Norway and Russia. He has collaborated extensively with trumpeter Volker Goetze and they have released three albums as a duo: Sira in 2008, Amanké Dionti in 2012 and Djaliya in 2014. Sira entered the top 10 world music radio chart on CMJ in January 2009.

Another collaboration with the Constantinople ensemble playing traditional Persian music resulted in the albums Jardins migrateurs (2012) and Traversées (2019).

Film
A 2011 feature-length documentary, Griot, directed by Volker Goetze, follows Cissoko, who is determined to preserve his thousand-year-old kora tradition. In the documentary Cissoko has a dream to have a thriving cultural centre where children can come to learn the traditions of their forefathers.

Discography

Solo
 2003: Diam (Ma Case / L'autre distribution)
 2005: Le Griot Rouge (Ma Case / L'autre distribution)
 2013: Mes Racines

with Volker Goetze
 2008: Sira (ObliqSound)
 2012: Amanké Dionti (Motéma)
 2014: Djaliya

with Cyrille Brotto
 2022: Deme Deme

with Majid Bekkas
 2011: Mabrouk (Bee Jazz)

with Simon Goubert
 2012: African Jazz Roots (Cristal)

References

External links

 

Living people
Senegalese Kora players
20th-century Senegalese male singers
1970 births
Motéma Music artists
21st-century Senegalese male singers